Kasva (also Romanized as Kāsvā) is a village in Qahan Rural District, Khalajastan District, Qom County, Qom Province, Iran. At the 2006 census, its population was 143, in 62 families.

The 14th-century author Hamdallah Mustawfi listed Kasva as one of the main villages in the district of Aveh.

References 

Populated places in Qom Province